, also written as 2002 XV93, is a trans-Neptunian object (TNO) with an absolute magnitude of 5.4. A 2:3 orbital resonance with Neptune makes it a plutino.

It has been observed with precovery images back to 1990.

Orbit and rotation

 is locked in 2:3 resonance with Neptune, which means that when it makes two revolutions around the Sun, Neptune makes exactly three.

The rotation period of this object is not known.

Physical characteristics
The size of  has been measured by the Herschel Space Telescope to be .

References

External links 
 
 
 

612533
612533
612533
20021210